Hou Jianguo (born October 1959) is a Chinese chemist and politician. He served as party secretary of the General Administration of Quality Supervision, Inspection and Quarantine from 2017 to 2018. An accomplished research scientist, Hou is an academician of the Chinese Academy of Sciences and The World Academy of Sciences. He formerly served as president of the University of Science and Technology of China (USTC) and has extensive international work experience.

Biography
Hou was born in Fuqing County, Fujian. He joined the workforce in October 1976 and joined the Chinese Communist Party in December 1985. He is a graduate of the University of Science and Technology of China (USTC) and holds a master's degree in condensed matter physics.  Between 1988 and 1995, he conducted research into crystallography and chemistry at the Soviet Academy of Sciences, the Fujian Institute of Research on the Structure of Matter, and at the University of California, Berkeley and Oregon State University.

In 1995, he became a professor at USTC - in charge of the Structural Science Research Lab and dean of the Physics and Chemistry department. In 2000, he was named vice president of the University. In November 2003, he was elected as a member of the Chinese Academy of Sciences. In November 2004, he became a member of The World Academy of Sciences. In September 2005, he was named executive vice president of the USTC, and promoted to president in 2008. On January 24, 2015, he became Deputy Minister of Science and Technology.

In November 2016, he was named deputy party chief of the Guangxi Zhuang Autonomous Region.

In June 2017, he was named party branch secretary and deputy director of the General Administration of Quality Supervision, Inspection and Quarantine.

In March 2018, he became vice-president of Chinese Academy of Sciences, rising to president in December 2020.

Honours and awards
 November 2003 Member of the Chinese Academy of Sciences (CAS)
 November 2004 Member of The World Academy of Sciences (TWAS)
 2007 Science and Technology Progress Award of the Ho Leung Ho Lee Foundation
 2008 Chen Kah Kee Prize for Chemical Science
 2014 Fellow of the Royal Society of Chemistry (FRSC)

References

1959 births
Living people
Chemists from Fujian
Chinese Communist Party politicians from Fujian
Members of the 19th Central Committee of the Chinese Communist Party
Members of the 20th Central Committee of the Chinese Communist Party
Members of the Chinese Academy of Sciences
People's Republic of China politicians from Fujian
Political office-holders in Guangxi
Politicians from Fuzhou
Presidents of the University of Science and Technology of China
TWAS fellows
University of Science and Technology of China alumni